The IEEE International Symposium on Computer Arithmetic (ARITH) is a conference in the area of computer arithmetic. 
The symposium was established in 1969, initially as three-year event, then as a
biennial event, and, finally, from 2015 as an annual symposium.

ARITH topics span from theoretical aspects and algorithms for operations, to hardware implementations of arithmetic units and applications of computer arithmetic.

ARITH symposia are sponsored by IEEE Computer Society.

List of ARITH symposia

References 

Computer arithmetic
Computer science conferences
Computer conferences
IEEE conferences